The current capital of Egypt is Cairo. Over the course of history, however, Egypt's capital has changed.

List of Egyptian capitals
Thinis: (3150 BC – 2686 BC) – I and II dynasties
 Memphis: (2686 BC – 2160 BC) – III dynasty to VIII dynasty 
 Heracleopolis Magna: (2160 BC – 2040 BC) – IX and X dynasties
 Thebes: (2135 BC – 1985 BC) – XI dynasty
 Itjtawy: (1985 BC – c.1700 BC) – XII dynasty and XIII dynasty
 Avaris: (1725 BC – 1550 BC) – XIV dynasty and  XV dynasty (Hyksos)
 Thebes: (c.1700 BC – c. 1353 BC) – XVI dynasty to XVIII dynasty before Akhenaten
 Akhetaten: (c. 1353 BC – c. 1332 BC) – Akhenaten of XVIII dynasty 
 Thebes: (c. 1332 BC – 1279 BC) – XVIII dynasty and XIX dynasty until Seti I
 Pi-Ramesses: (1279 BC – 1078 BC) – XIX dynasty starting from Ramesses II and XX dynasty
 Tanis: (1078 BC – 945 BC) – XXI dynasty
 Bubastis/Tanis: (945 BC – 715 BC) – XXII dynasty
 Leontopolis/Thebes: (818 BC – 715 BC) – XXIII dynasty
 Sais: (725 BC – 715 BC) – XXIV dynasty
 Memphis (715 BC – 664 BC) – XXV dynasty (The Kushite rulers were based in Napata, Sudan but ruled Egypt from Memphis)
 Sais: (664 BC – 525 BC) – XXVI dynasty
 Memphis: (525 BC – 404 BC) – XXVII dynasty (first satrapy of Egypt under the Achaemenid Empire)
 Sais: (404 BC – 399 BC) – XXVIII dynasty
 Mendes: (399 BC – 380 BC) – XXIX dynasty
 Sebennytos: (380 BC – 343 BC) – XXX dynasty
 Memphis: (343 BC – 332 BC) – XXXI dynasty (second satrapy of Egypt under the Achaemenid Empire)
 Alexandria: (332 BC – 641 AD) – Greco-Roman period

Since the Muslim conquest of Egypt in 641, Egypt has been ruled from a series of settlements currently situated in Old Cairo:
 Fustat: (641 AD – 750 AD)
 Al-Askar: (750 – 868 AD)
 Al-Qata'i: (868 – 905 AD)  
 Fustat: (905 – 972 AD)
 Cairo: the current capital since 972 AD

See also
 List of cities and towns in Egypt
 New Administrative Capital

Egypt
Egyptian capitals
Capitals
Capitals List
Capitals